District 4 is an athletic league, a member of the 5A division of the Louisiana High School Athletic Association (LHSAA).  Division 5A is the highest level in the LHSAA, comprising schools with more than 1,159 students.  The 5A classification was established in 1991.  The current seven members are among 68 schools classified as 5A, of which 63 play all sports including football (including all seven District 4 schools).  Members are generally from East Baton Rouge Parish and Livingston Parish.  The league's structure will keep the same schools at least until the summer of 2017.  Teams and individuals from these schools have won state championships.

Members
Baton Rouge High School, Baton Rouge
Catholic High School, Baton Rouge
Central High School, Central
Liberty Magnet High School, Baton Rouge
Scotlandville Magnet High School, Baton Rouge
St Joseph's Academy, Baton Rouge
Woodlawn High School, Baton Rouge
Zachary High School, Zachary

Former members
 Baker High School
 Belaire High School
 Broadmoor High School
 Denham Springs High School
 Dutchtown High School 
 East Ascension High School 
 Istrouma High School
 Live Oak High School 
 McKinley Senior High School
 St. Amant High School
 Tara High School
 Walker High School

Sports

Fall
 Cross Country  Boys and Girls
 Football
 Swimming  Boys and Girls
 Volleyball

Winter
 Basketball   Boys and Girls
 Indoor Track and Field   Boys and Girls
 Powerlifting
 Soccer  Boys and Girls
 Wrestling

Spring
 Baseball
 Bowling
 Golf  Boys and Girls
 Gymnastics  Boys and Girls
 Softball
 Tennis  Boys and Girls
 Outdoor Track and Field  Boys and Girls

There is also non-sanctioned Cheerleading.

State Championships

Central
 Baseball 2017, 1995, 1994, 1993, 1992, 1978
 Bowling 2015 Jacob Carretson
 Football 1966
 Track 2010  Indoor 55m and Outdoor 100m  Trevor Sansome

Denham Springs
 Baseball 1986
 Boys Basketball 1956 (1A), 1950, 1948, (1923?), 2005 State Gatorade Player of the Year, Tasmin Mitchell
 Track 2015 Girls High Jump Abigail O'Donoghue

Live Oak
 Boys Basketball 1956 (B)
 Track 
2013 Girls Shot Put Ashley Davis 
2014 Girls Shot Put Ashley Davis, 
2015  Girls Shot Put Ashley Davis

Scotlandville
 Boys Basketball 2012, 2013, 2015
 Track 
1996 Girls 4x100 Relay (4A State Record), Girls 4x200 Relay (4A State Record)
2005 Girls 4x200 Relay (3A State Record), Girls 4x400 Relay (3A State Record)

Walker
 Basketball
2018 Boys Basketball 
2018/19 Gatorade Player of the year: Jalen Cook

 Track 
2014 Boys Pole Vault Kyle Baudoin

Zachary
Baseball
2009 4A, 2008 4A, 2007 4A 2009 State Gatorade Player of the Year, Zachary Von Rosenburg
 Boys Basketball 1944, 1941
 Track  
2013 Boys Long Jump Donald Gaze, 
2014 Girls Team, Girls 4x200 meters relay, Girls 400 meters Janie O'Connor 
2015 Girls Team, Girls 100 meters and 400 meters Janie O'Connor

See also
 List of Louisiana high school athletic districts

References

Louisiana high school sports conferences
1991 establishments in Louisiana